The Ole Miss Rebels college football team represents the University of Mississippi (Ole Miss) in the West Division of the Southeastern Conference (SEC). The Rebels compete as part of the National Collegiate Athletic Association (NCAA) Division I Football Bowl Subdivision. The program has had 38 head coaches since it began play during the 1893 season. The current head coach is Lane Kiffin, whose hiring was announced on December 7, 2019 after former coach Matt Luke was fired at the end of his third season (including one year as interim head coach).

The team has played 1,242 games, including 33 wins later vacated as a result of NCAA penalties, over 125 seasons. In that time, eight coaches have led the Rebels in postseason bowl games: Ed Walker, Johnny Vaught, Billy Brewer, Tommy Tuberville, David Cutcliffe, Houston Nutt, Hugh Freeze, and Kiffin. Vaught won six conference championships as a member of the SEC and three national championships with the Rebels.

Vaught is the leader in seasons coached and games won, with 190 victories during his 25 years with the program. C. D. Clark has the highest winning percentage of those who have coached more than one game, with .857. Z. N. Estes and Frank Mason have the lowest winning percentage of those who have coached more than one game, with .000. Of the 38 different head coaches who have led the Rebels, Vaught is the only one to have been inducted as a head coach into the College Football Hall of Fame.

Key

Coaches

Notes

References 
General

 
 

Specific

Lists of college football head coaches
Ole Miss Rebels football coaches